Vashki is a rural locality (a village) in Vasilyevskoye Rural Settlement, Vashkinsky District, Vologda Oblast, Russia. The population was 36 as of 2002.

Geography 
Vashki is located 6 km northwest of Lipin Bor (the district's administrative centre) by road. Verkhneye Khotino is the nearest rural locality.

References 

Rural localities in Vashkinsky District